Who's Sorry Now? may refer to:

 "Who's Sorry Now?" (song), a 1923 popular song  by Ted Snyder, Bert Kalmar and Harry Ruby
 Who's Sorry Now? (Connie Francis album), 1958
 Who's Sorry Now (album), by Marie Osmond, 1975
 Who's Sorry Now? (Babyland album), 1995
 Who's Sorry Now?, a 1984 autobiography by Connie Francis